The 2002–03 Israel State Cup (Gvia HaMedina) was the 64th season of Israel's nationwide football cup competition and the 49th after the Israeli Declaration of Independence.

The competition was won by Hapoel Ramat Gan who had beaten Hapoel Be'er Sheva 5–4 on penalties after 1–1 in the final. This is the first time the cup was won by a club outside the top division.

By winning, Hapoel Ramat Gan qualified to the 2003–04 UEFA Cup, entering in the first round.

Results

Seventh Round

Byes: Hapoel Bat Yam, Hapoel Beit She'an, Hapoel Nahlat Yehuda, Maccabi HaShikma Ramat Hen.

Intermediate Round

Eighth Round

Round of 16

Quarter-finals

Semi-finals

Final

References
100 Years of Football 1906-2006, Elisha Shohat (Israel), 2006, p. 319
Israel Cups 2002/03 RSSSF

Israel State Cup
State Cup
Israel State Cup seasons